Tmesipteris parva is a fern ally endemic to eastern Australia. The habitat of this primitive plant is on tree ferns in moist eucalyptus forests rainforests.

References

Psilotaceae
Flora of New South Wales
Flora of Victoria (Australia)
Flora of Queensland
Epiphytes